Platax is a genus of Indo-Pacific, reef-associated fish belonging to the family Ephippidae. There are currently five known extant species generally accepted to belong to the genus. They are one of the fish taxa commonly known as "batfish".

Description
Members of the genus Platax are generally similar in shape to the other species in the family. Adults are rather disc-shaped fish, with laterally compressed bodies and large dorsal and anal fins that give individuals a somewhat triangular profile.

Distribution
Platax can be found in reefs throughout the entire Indo-Pacific region. Their range extends from the western Indian Ocean in the Red Sea to as far east as Australia. Most Platax species can be found in higher latitudes, as high as the Ryukyu Islands in Japan and as far south as the eastern coast of Australia. However, the ranges of the individual species is not consistent throughout the genus' range. Platax pinnatus for example is most likely not found in the Indian Ocean. A few individuals have been found in Atlantic waters. Apparently, the species Platax orbicularis has been observed in Florida waters as a non-native, invasive species. The aquarium industry has been blamed for the spread of this species into the Caribbean.

Members of the genus are most common around reefs and shipwrecks.

Taxonomy
The genus was first used by Cuvier with the publication of his 1816 system of animal classification. He assigned the genus to the batfish species Platax boersii, a classification which still holds to this day. Another species to be assigned to the genus by Cuvier was Platax ocellatus, a butterflyfish that is now more correctly classified in the genus Chaetodon in Chaetodontidae. In the same work, a species that is now known to belong to the genus, Platax teira was classified by Cuvier in a different genus, Chaetodon teira.

A few species have been assigned to the genus that have since been reclassified into other genera. The butterflyfish, C. ocellatus mentioned above is one of these species. Another species that has been mistakenly classified as a Platax is the common freshwater angelfish, Pterophyllum scalare. In a joint effort with Valenciennes, Cuvier published a natural history work in 1831 where the freshwater angelfish was classified as Platax scalaris. The freshwater angelfish, of course is not as closely related to the marine batfish as to warrant classification in the same genus. A more scientifically acceptable mis-classification would be that of the species Zabidius novemaculeatus. This species was first described as Platax novemaculeatus by Mcculloch when it was discovered from Australia in the early 1900s. The species is now classified in the genus Zabidius, which is still in the same family as the genus Platax.

The generic name, "platax" was coined from the Greek term platys - meaning "flat". This refers to the generally compressed body shape of the fish. They are commonly called "batfish". However, they are not the only fish taxon called by this name. Fish from the only distantly related family Ogcocephalidae are also commonly known as "batfish". Other families with species that have been referred to as "batfish" include the families Dactylopteridae, Drepaneidae, Monacanthidae, and Monodactylidae.

Species
There are currently five recognized species in this genus:
 Platax batavianus G. Cuvier, 1831 (Humpback batfish)
 Platax boersii Bleeker, 1852 (Golden spadefish)
 Platax orbicularis (Forsskål, 1775) (Orbicular batfish)
 Platax pinnatus (Linnaeus, 1758) (Dusky batfish)
 Platax teira (Forsskål, 1775) (Longfin batfish)

There are also at least four fossil species known:
 Platax altissimus Agassiz, 1842
 Platax macropterygious Agassiz, 1842
 Platax papilio Agassiz, 1842
 Platax woodwardii Agassiz, 1842

References

External links

Batfish may come to Great Barrier Reef's rescue. NewScientist.

Ephippidae
Extant Eocene first appearances
Marine fish genera
Taxa named by Georges Cuvier